In modern computer science and statistics, the complexity index of a function denotes the level of informational content, which in turn affects the difficulty of learning the function from examples. This is different from computational complexity, which is the difficulty to compute a function. Complexity indices characterize the entire class of functions to which the one we are interested in belongs. Focusing on Boolean functions, the detail of a class  of Boolean functions c essentially denotes how deeply the class is articulated.

Technical definition
Let us focus for a moment on a single function c, call it a concept defined on a set  of elements that we may figure as points in a Euclidean space. We may dually define these points  in terms of sentinelling a given concept c from being fully enclosed (invaded) by another concept within the class.
 the sentry points are external to the concept c to be sentineled and internal to at least one other including it,
 they constitute a minimal set with these properties.

Definition of sentry function 
For a concept class  on a space , a sentry function is a total function  satisfying the following conditions:
 Sentinels are outside the sentineled concept ( for all ).
Denoting  the set of concepts invading c, we must have that if , then ).
  is a minimal set with the above properties (No  exists satisfying (1) and (2) and having the property that  for every ).
 Sentinels are honest guardians. It may be that  but  so that .

 is the frontier of c upon .

With reference to the picture on the right,  is a candidate frontier of  against .

Definition of detail 
The frontier size of the most expensive concept to be sentineled with the least efficient sentineling function, i.e. the quantity

,

Actually, proper subsets of  may host sentineling tasks that prove harder than those emerging with  itself.

The detail  is a complexity measure of concept classes dual to the VC dimension . The former uses points to separate sets of concepts, the latter concepts for partitioning sets of points. In particular the following inequality holds 

See also  Rademacher complexity for a recently introduced class complexity index.

Example: continuous spaces 
Class C of circles in  has detail , as shown in the picture on left below.

Example: discrete spaces 

This class has . As usual we may have different sentineling functions. A worst case , as illustrated, is: . However a cheaper one is :

References 
 
 

Computational complexity theory
Algorithmic inference